Tripoli air crash may refer to

 Libyan Arab Airlines Flight 1103 - a mid air collision on approach to Tripoli International Airport in 1992
 Afriqiyah Airways Flight 771 - a crash on approach to Tripoli International Airport in 2010